Ring 5 may refer to:

 Ring 5 (ring of Uranus)
 Ring 5 (Copenhagen), a proposed ring road in Denmark

See also
Ring (disambiguation)
5th Ring Road, in Beijing, China